Eilema fimbriata is a moth of the subfamily Arctiinae first described by John Henry Leech in 1890. It is found in central China.

References

fimbriata